WWYO is a Full Service formatted broadcast radio station licensed to Pineville, West Virginia, serving Pineville and Wyoming County, West Virginia.  WWYO is owned and operated by MRJ, Inc.

WWYO's license was cancelled by the Federal Communications Commission on October 26, 2020 and restored a day later.

See also
 History of WWYO

External links
 WWYO Online

WYO
Radio stations established in 1949
1949 establishments in West Virginia